As of January 2020, the International Union for Conservation of Nature (IUCN) listed 203 critically endangered mammalian species, including 31 which are tagged as possibly extinct. Of all evaluated mammalian species, 3.5% are listed as critically endangered. 
The IUCN also lists 60 mammalian subspecies as critically endangered.

Of the subpopulations of mammals evaluated by the IUCN, 18 species subpopulations have been assessed as critically endangered.

Additionally 900 mammalian species (15% of those evaluated) are listed as data deficient, meaning there is insufficient information for a full assessment of conservation status. As these species typically have small distributions and/or populations, they are intrinsically likely to be threatened, according to the IUCN. While the category of data deficient indicates that no assessment of extinction risk has been made for the taxa, the IUCN notes that it may be appropriate to give them "the same degree of attention as threatened taxa, at least until their status can be assessed".

This is a complete list of critically endangered mammalian species and subspecies evaluated by the IUCN. Species considered possibly extinct by the IUCN are marked as such. Species and subspecies which have critically endangered subpopulations (or stocks) are indicated. Where possible common names for taxa are given while links point to the scientific name used by the IUCN.

Primates
There are 63 species and 37 subspecies of primates assessed as critically endangered.

Gibbons

Species

Great apes

Species

Subspecies

Lemurs

Species

Subspecies

Tarsiers

Species
Siau Island tarsier
Subspecies
Natuna Islands tarsier

Old World monkeys

Species

Subspecies

New World monkeys

Species

Subspecies

Lorisoidea
Javan slow loris

Odd-toed ungulates

Species

Subspecies

Cetartiodactyls
Cetartiodactyla includes dolphins, whales and even-toed ungulates. There are 15 species, nine subspecies, and nine subpopulations of cetartiodactyl assessed as critically endangered.

Non-cetacean even-toed ungulates

Species

Subspecies

Cetaceans

Species
Baiji (possibly extinct)
Vaquita
Rice's whale
North Atlantic right whale
Atlantic humpback dolphin
Subspecies

Subpopulations

Marsupials

Carnivora

Species

Subspecies

Subpopulations

Eulipotyphla

Lagomorpha

Rodents
There are 58 species and one subspecies of rodent assessed as critically endangered.

Hystricomorpha

Myomorpha
There are 37 species in Myomorpha assessed as critically endangered.

Murids

Cricetids

Nesomyids
Mount Kahuzi climbing mouse

Castorimorpha

Species

Subspecies
Alcorn's pocket gopher

Sciuromorpha
Namdapha flying squirrel
Vancouver Island marmot

Bats

Other mammals

Species

Subspecies
Sumatran elephant
Subpopulations
Juliana's golden mole (1 subpopulation)

See also 
 Lists of IUCN Red List critically endangered species
 List of least concern mammals
 List of near threatened mammals
 List of vulnerable mammals
 List of endangered mammals
 List of recently extinct mammals
 List of data deficient mammals

References 

Mammals
Critically endangered mammals
Critically endangered mammals
Mammal conservation